Elizabeth Bristol Greenleaf (1895-1980) was an American collector of folk songs. She was among the first people to collect both the words and the music of the folk songs of Newfoundland, and (together with the musicologist Grace Yarrow Mansfield) compiled the definitive collection of them.

Life
Elisabeth Bristol was born in New York, the daughter of Charles Bristol and Ellen, née Gallup. She graduated Phi Beta Kappa from Vassar College in 1917. In 1920 she volunteered to teach for the Grenfell Mission summer school at Sally's Cove, near Bonne Bay on the west coast of Newfoundland. There she heard traditional singing for the first time and began to write down the songs she heard.  In 1921 she returned to Newfoundland to teach for a summer, and again in 1929 with a musicologist, Grace Yarrow Mansfield as part of the Vassar College Folklore Expedition to Newfoundland.

They made an extensive collection of folksongs and tunes, published in 1933 by Harvard University Press as Ballads and Sea Songs of Newfoundland. This was the first scholarly publication of a collection of Newfoundland folksongs and one of the first North American collections to give the tunes equal emphasis with the texts. The book, reprinted in 1968, remains a definitive source of the songs of Newfoundland.

She is buried with her husband, William Eben Greenleaf (1890-1959), in Ledyard Center Cemetery.

References

Further reading
 R. D. Madison (ed.) Newfoundland summers: the ballad collecting of Elisabeth Bristol Greenleaf. Westerly, R.I.: Utter Co., 1982.

External links
 Scrapbook of Elizabeth Bristol Greenleaf
 Index of songs collected by Greenleaf and Mansfield

1895 births
1980 deaths
People from New York (state)
Vassar College alumni
20th-century American educators
American folk-song collectors
20th-century American musicians